The 2009–10 East Tennessee State Buccaneers men's basketball team represented East Tennessee State University in the 2009–10 NCAA Division I men's basketball season. The Buccaneers, led by head coach Murry Bartow, played their home games at the Memorial Center in Johnson City, Tennessee, as members of the Atlantic Sun Conference. After finishing 5th in the conference regular season standings, the Buccaneers won the A-Sun tournament to earn an automatic bid to the NCAA tournament as No. 16 seed in the East region. East Tennessee State was beaten by No. 1 seed Kentucky in the opening round, 100–71.

Roster 

Source

Schedule and results

|-
!colspan=12 style=|Regular season

|-
!colspan=12 style=| SoCon tournament

|-
!colspan=12 style=| NCAA tournament

Source

References

East Tennessee State Buccaneers men's basketball seasons
East Tennessee State
East Tennessee State
East Tennessee State Buccaneers men's basketball
East Tennessee State Buccaneers men's basketball